Kafr Mousa (also spelled Kafr Musa) is a village in central Syria, administratively part of the Homs Governorate, located south of Homs. Nearby localities include Ghassaniya to the north, Damina al-Gharbiya to the east, al-Qusayr to the southeast, Arjoun to the south and al-Houz to the east. According to the Central Bureau of Statistics (CBS), Kafr Mousa had a population of 1,610 in the 2004 census. Its inhabitants are predominantly Sunni Muslims.

References

Bibliography

Populated places in al-Qusayr District